"I Want You Back" is the debut solo single by British singer Melanie B features American rapper Missy Elliott from the soundtrack to the 1998 film Why Do Fools Fall in Love. After two years, the song was also included on her debut album, Hot (2000). "I Want You Back" peaked at the top of the UK Singles Chart on 20 September 1998.

Background
Melanie B recalled, "This was the first time I'd even considered doing anything by myself. I was on tour with the Spice Girls when Missy "Misdemeanor" Elliott called me up and said 'Melanie, I've got a song for you, will you come and record it with me?' I checked it with the girls and within a month I was out there, I recorded it in a day, did the video, then came back. She's a genius!"

Music video
The video was directed by Hype Williams. The video uses the radio edit version of the song and the cover for the single is a still from the music video. The entire video is show with a green hue on screen with occasional use of red and blue, the video starts with Melanie and Missy singing the intro and as the first verse starts, Melanie is seen with her then-fiancée, Jimmy Gulzar, as she smacks, hits and teases him. Melanie is pregnant in the video. In the second verse Melanie is seen crawling on a table to meet Jimmy at the end for more teasing, wearing Gene Simmons-esque make-up. As the bridge comes on, Melanie is seen in a cage with Jimmy high in the air. Shots of Melanie, Missy, and back up dancers in cowboy hats are seen dancing as the video ends.

Track listings
UK CD
 "I Want You Back"  – 3:25
 "I Want You Back"  – 3:51
 "I Want You Back"  – 8:22

UK 12-inch vinyl 
A1. "I Want You Back"  – 8:22
B1. "I Want You Back"  – 8:16
B2. "I Want You Back"  – 3:51

European CD
 "I Want You Back"  – 3:25
 "I Want You Back"  – 3:55

Australian CD
 "I Want You Back"  – 3:25
 "I Want You Back"  – 3:51
 "I Want You Back"  – 8:22

Charts

Weekly charts

Year-end charts

Certifications

|}

Release history

References

1998 songs
1998 debut singles
Mel B songs
Missy Elliott songs
Music videos directed by Hype Williams
Songs written by Mel B
Songs written by Missy Elliott
UK Singles Chart number-one singles
Virgin Records singles